Lionel James Sanders (born February 22, 1988) is a Canadian professional triathlete and the winner of the 2017 ITU Long Distance Triathlon World Championships. In 2017 and 2021, he also placed second at the Ironman World Championship. In 2014 he placed fourth in the 2014 Ironman 70.3 World Championship held in Mont-Tremblant, Quebec. Sanders's first professional race was in September 2013 at the Muskoka Ironman 70.3, where he took 1st place over Andreas Raelert.

Career

Born in Windsor, Ontario, Sanders attended the University of Windsor, and later transferred to McMaster University in Hamilton where he ran for the cross-country running team.

In 2013 Sanders began to race local Ontario Multisport Canada triathlons. Sanders officially began his professional triathlete career in September when he continued his win streak by taking first place in 70.3 Muskoka. The following year Sanders went on to have a successful 2014 Ironman 70.3 season with notable wins at the Ironman 70.3 races in Muncie, Racine and Steelhead.  After his 4th-place finish at the 2014 Ironman 70.3 World Championships Sanders finished his first Ironman distance race as a professional at Ironman Florida on November 1, 2014; an event he won. In that race, the swim was cancelled due to poor conditions.

Sanders had a string of 70.3 victories in 2015, combined with some learning experiences at the Ironman distance. At Ironman Texas Sanders struggled under the oppressive heat & humid conditions, fading on the run and taking a fourth. At Ironman Mont Tremblant Sanders had a disappointing performance, finishing fifth. This was Sanders's first time competing at the Ironman World Championship in Kona, Hawaii where he finished 14th. Sanders went on to Ironman Arizona finishing with a time under 8 hours to take his first official full distance victory (a year before he won Ironman Florida, however the swim was cancelled).

On November 20, 2016, Sanders set a new world record for the full distance triathlon at Ironman Arizona, with a winning time of 7:44:29. The previous record, held by Marino Vanhoenacker, had stood for five years. Sanders' 2016 Record was broken by Tim Don in 2017 Edition of Ironman Brazil in Florianopolis.

In 2017, Sanders won ITU Long Distance Triathlon World Championships in Penticton, British Columbia, Canada. Sander's won all but one 70.3 race that he entered, the exception being 70.3 St. George, where he finished second to Alistair Brownlee. Sanders led the Ironman World Championship in Kona Hawaii through mile 23 of the marathon before being passed by Patrick Lange. Lionel would hold on to finish second. In 2018 Sanders continued his success, winning most of his races, except Oceanside 70.3, which he lost to Jan Frodeno. In June, he won Challenge Family "The Championship" again against Sebastian Kienle in a time of 3:44 before winning Mont-Tremblant 70.3. In full distance racing, Sanders placed 2nd at Ironman Mont-Tremblant and 29th at the Ironman World Championships.

Record attempts
On October 23, 2020, Sanders broke the Canadian national hour record with a distance of 51.304 kilometres.

On the 18th of July 2021 Lionel Sanders joined Jan Frodeno in Allgäu, Germany trying to beat the long-distance world record in triathlon. This was a 3.8 km swim, 180 km bike and 42.2 km run. Frodeno broke his own record while Sanders came within eight minutes of the old record while also setting two personal best splits with the swim and the bike. His results were: 50:59 – 4:00:26 – 2:50:31 with a final time of 7:43:28.

Personal
Sanders has been public about the substance abuse problem that eventually led him to sign up for the 2010 Ironman Louisville in late 2009. He finished in a time of 10:14:31.  The Hamilton Spectator wrote an in-depth article detailing his substance abuse past and how he will be telling this story for the rest of his life. He was quoted as saying, "I want to prove to anyone who has ever battled addiction that not only can you beat it, but you can turn yourself into something great in the process."

Sanders is married to Erin Macdonald.

Race history

2013

2014

2015

2016

2017

2018

2019

2022

References

Canadian male triathletes
Sportspeople from Windsor, Ontario
McMaster University alumni
Living people
1988 births